Melevaryathe Malakhakkuttikal (The Angels Above) is a 2000 Indian Malayalam-language film directed by Thulasidas, starring Balachandra Menon, Geetha, Abhirami and Jomol.

Plot 

In order to protect his family from his sexually abusive father, Sethumadhavan, in the guise of an elderly man, tries to protect the family.

Cast 
 Balachandra Menon as  Sethumadhavan (Sethu)
 Geetha as Vasundara Devi
 Abhirami as Devika Warrier/Devu
 Jomol as Gopika Warrier/Gopu
 Krishna as Sarath
 KPAC Lalitha as Kunjukutti Warrasiyar
 Sajitha Betti as Malu/ Malavika Warrier
 Jagathy Sreekumar as Adv. K.K Warrier
 Harishree Ashokan as Parthdasaradhi
 Jose Pellissery as Josephettan
 M. S. Thripunithura as Magistrate
 Salim Kumar as Bhaskaran
 Anzil as Unni
 Swathy as Kunjumol
 Priyanka Anoop as helper Shakundala
 Bindu Murali
Baby Surendran

Reception 
One critic wrote that "The director has tried to maintain a balance to the two storylines that are running parallely. Another critic wrote that "25th Film directed by Tulasidass disappoints everybody".

References 

2000s Malayalam-language films